Sittin' on a Backyard Fence is a 1933 Warner Bros. Merrie Melodies cartoon directed by Earl Duvall. The short was released on December 16, 1933.

The film score was composed by Norman Spencer and writing was done by Ben Hardaway.

Summary
In the middle of the night two cats are singing to each other. Then another cat wants to sing with the female cat. She lets him. Then a fight starts between the two rival males, and the cats go on a telephone line. A person throws a rolling pin at them. Then they start rolling on the wires. They run into an old dog house and the dog scares them. The male cats eventually realize that the female cat has had babies, and one of them blows a raspberry at them. The two male cats shake hands and the film ends.

Home media
The short was released on the Looney Tunes Golden Collection: Volume 6, Disc 3.

See also
 Looney Tunes and Merrie Melodies filmography (1929–39)

References

External links
 

1933 films
1933 animated films
American black-and-white films
Films scored by Norman Spencer (composer)
Films directed by Earl Duvall
Merrie Melodies short films
Warner Bros. Cartoons animated short films
Animated films about cats
1930s Warner Bros. animated short films